Wallonia is a region located in southern Belgium, and divided into 262 municipalities, listed in the table below. The numbers refer to the location of the municipalities on the maps of the respective provinces.

Eupen, Kelmis, Raeren, Lontzen, Büllingen, Bütgenbach, Burg-Reuland, Amel and Sankt Vith form the German-speaking community of Belgium.

See also 

 List of municipalities of Belgium
 List of former municipalities in Wallonia
 List of cities in Wallonia

Walloon Region